The Olin Raschig process is a chemical process for the production of hydrazine. The main steps in this process, patented by German chemist Friedrich Raschig in 1906 and one of three reactions named after him, are the formation of monochloramine from ammonia and hypochlorite, and the subsequent reaction of monochloramine with ammonia towards hydrazine. The process was further optimised and used by the Olin Corporation for the production of anhydrous hydrazine for aerospace applications.

The commercially used Olin Raschig process consists of the following steps:
sodium hypochlorite solution is mixed with a threefold excess of ammonia at 5 °C to give monochloramine 
the monochloramine solution is added to a 30-fold excess of ammonia at 130 °C and elevated pressure
excess ammonia and the side product sodium chloride are removed 
water is removed by azeotropic distillation with aniline

References

Chemical processes